Eurema sari, the chocolate grass yellow, is a butterfly in the family Pieridae. It is found in Southeast Asia.

Adults have a distinct brown apex on the underside of the forewing.

The larvae feed on Leguminosae species.

Subspecies
The following subspecies are recognised:
Eurema sari curiosa (Swinhoe, [1885]) – (India)
Eurema sari obucola (Fruhstorfer, 1910) – (southern Borneo, Natuna, Palawan)
Eurema sari sari – (Java)
Eurema sari sodalis (Moore, 1886) – (southern Burma, Peninsular Malaya, Singapore, Thailand, Indo-China, Sumatra, northern Borneo)
Eurema sari thyreus (Fruhstorfer, 1910) – (Enggano)

References

sari
Butterflies described in 1829
Butterflies of Singapore
Butterflies of Borneo
Butterflies of Indochina